Jaime Stiglich Berninzon was a Peruvian diplomat.

Career
On January 1, 1969 he entered the diplomatic service as a Third Secretary.
On January 1, 1972 he was appointed Second Secretary.
On January 1, 1975 he was appointed First Secretary.
On January 1, 1979 he was appointed Director.
On January 1, 1982 he was appointed  Minister Counselor
On January 1, 1987 he was appointed Minister.
On January 1, 1991 he was appointed Ambassador.
From April 2006 to 2011 he was Director of the Decentralized Office of the Ministry of Foreign Affairs for Tacna and Moquegua.

In the foreign ministry 
1969-71 Third Secretary, Coordinator of the Undersecretariat of Economic Affairs and Integration
1976-77 First Secretary, Head of the Department of International Commodity Policy of the Directorate of Economic Affairs
1984 Minister Counselor, Sub-Director of Integration of the Undersecretariat of Economic Affairs and Integration
1985 (Jan-Jun) Minister-Counselor, highlighted to the Presidency of the Republic to implement a cooperation program for children in the Office of the First Lady
1986-87 Minister-Counselor and Minister, Director of Programming and Administrative Coordination, in charge of the financial management of the public funds of the Ministry of Foreign Affairs as well as the support of the Budget before the Congress of the Republic.
1992 Ambassador, Cabinet Director of the Ministerial Office
1993 (Feb-Apr) Ambassador, Advisor to the Minister of Foreign Affairs
1999 (Jul) until Dec 2001 Ambassador, Executive Director of the Office of Economic Promotion, in charge of Commercial Promotion; of Investments and Tourism
2002 (Jan-Mar) Ambassador, Advisor to the Diplomatic Academy of Peru
2002 (Apr-Jun) Ambassador, highlighted to the National Chamber of Commerce, Production and Services
(PERUCAMARAS), as Executive Director (guild that brings together 68 Chambers of Commerce throughout the country)

Abroad 
1971-72-73-74 Third, Second and First Secretary of the Embassy of Peru in Chile

1975 First Secretary and Chargé d'affaires of the Embassy of Peru in Cairo in the Arab Republic of Egypt.
1977-78 First Secretary and Counselor of the Embassy of Peru in Argentina
1979 Counselor, General Consul attached to the Consulate General in Barcelona
1981-84 Counselor and Minister Counselor of the Embassy of Peru in Spain
1988-90 Minister, Alternate Permanent Representative of Peru to International Organizations, based in Geneva, Switzerland
1991 Ambassador, Alternate Permanent Representative of Peru to International Organizations, based in Geneva, Switzerland

From November May 1993 to October 1995 he was ambassador in Stockholm and concurrently accredited in  Denmark and Norway, and the Republics of Iceland and Finland.

From November 1995 to June 1999 he was ambassador in Tel Aviv.
2002 Jul-Nov Ambassador, Consul General of Peru in Shanghai, People's Republic of China.

Commissions
He has participated in countless meetings as a Delegate; Head of Delegation and Representative of Peru in Conferences and Assemblies of the CAN, SELA, APEC, UNCTAD, GATT, WIPO, ILO, Human Rights, WTO, ITU, WMO, IOM, UNHCR, OAS, UNEP, ICRC, ECLAC, etc.
He has been Head of Delegation, representing the Ministry of Foreign Affairs, to negotiate Investment Promotion and Guarantee Agreements with Sweden, Finland, Norway, Denmark, Croatia, Egypt, Indonesia, Israel, etc. as well as in the renegotiation of the Peruvian External Debt.
He has integrated the Board of Directors of the Export Promotion Commission of Peru (PROMPEX), on behalf of the Minister of Foreign Affairs (July 1999 to Dec 2001)
He has participated as a guest in various Directories of the Confederation of Business Institutions of Peru (CONFIEP) linked to the promotion of exports and the acquisition of investments, on behalf of the Ministry of Foreign Affairs.

Publications
 The Reopening of the Suez Canal, 1975, Embassy of Peru, Cairo, Arab Republic of Egypt, 1975
 Possibilities of an Economic-Commercial Projection to Africa and the Middle East, Embassy of Peru, Buenos Aires, Argentina, 1978
 Peru, Road to Democracy, Notebooks of the University of Salamanca, 1981

Experience in the private sector
 Advisor for International Affairs of the Directory of the Confederation of Peruvian Business Institutions (CONFIEP)
 Executive Director of the Peruvian Chamber of Commerce, Production and Services (PERÚ CÁMARAS)
 He has been General Manager of the company PKS Industrial SAC, which managed a bottling plant for soft drinks March 2003 - February 2006
 He has been the Administrative Manager of the Puerto Nuevo SAC Real Estate company that designed an ecological beach at Km. 72.5 Panamericana Sur

Decorations
Entrust of Number Isabel La Católica of the Kingdom of Spain
Grand Officer of the Order of Merit of the Republic of Chile
Great Cru

References

1945 births
2015 deaths
Ambassadors of Peru to Israel
Ambassadors of Peru to Sweden